Roger Baens (18 August 1933 – 26 March 2020) was a Belgian cyclist.

Major results

1954
 1st Stage 2 Tour de Belgique amateurs
 1st Stage 4 Tour du Nord
1955
 1st  National Amateur Road Race Championships
1956
 1st Stage 2 Tour d'Anvers-Gand
1957
 1st Stage 15 Vuelta a España
1958
 1st Stage 3 Tour of Belgium
 1st Ronde van Limburg
 1st De Drie Zustersteden
 1st Grote Prijs Stad Zottegem
1959
 1st  Overall Dwars door Vlaanderen
1st Stage 1
 1st Tour du Brabant
 1st Grand Prix d'Orchies
 1st Stage 3 Ronde van Limburg
1960
 1st Grand Prix des Carrières
 1st Stage 3 Tour du Brabant
 2nd Overall Tour of the Netherlands
1st Stages 1 & 2
1961
 1st Stage 2 Tour of the Netherlands
 1st Stage 2 Grand Prix de Denain
1962
 1st Stage 2 (TTT) Tour de France
 3rd Overall Deutschland Tour
1st Stage 3
1963
 1st Stages 9 & 14 Vuelta a España

Grand Tour Results
1957
 22nd Overall, Vuelta a España
1959
 DNF, Vuelta a España
1962
 43rd Overall Tour de France
1963
 22nd Overall, Vuelta a España
 DNF Tour de France after Stage 10

References

1933 births
2020 deaths
Belgian male cyclists
People from Diest
Cyclists from Flemish Brabant